Ahmad Faiz (born 12 February 1988) is a Malaysian cricketer who captains the Malaysia national cricket team. He was part of Malaysia's squad for the 2008 Under-19 Cricket World Cup. He played in the 2014 ICC World Cricket League Division Three tournament.

He was a member of the Malaysian cricket team which won the gold medal in the men's 50 overs tournament after defeating Singapore by 251 runs in the finals at the 2017 Southeast Asian Games.

In April 2018, he was named in Malaysia's squad for the 2018 ICC World Cricket League Division Four tournament, also in Malaysia. He finished as the leading run-scorer for the tournament, with 298 runs in six matches.

In August 2018, he was named the captain of Malaysia's squad for the 2018 Asia Cup Qualifier tournament. In October 2018, he was named the captain of Malaysia's squad in the Eastern sub-region group for the 2018–19 ICC World Twenty20 Asia Qualifier tournament.

In June 2019, he was named in Malaysia's squad for the 2019 Malaysia Tri-Nation Series tournament. He made his Twenty20 International (T20I) debut for Malayasia, against Thailand, on 24 June 2019. The following month, he was named as the captain of Malaysia's squad for the Regional Finals of the 2018–19 ICC T20 World Cup Asia Qualifier tournament. He made his List A debut for Malaysia, against Denmark, in the 2019 Malaysia Cricket World Cup Challenge League A tournament on 16 September 2019.

References

External links
 

1988 births
Living people
Malaysian cricketers
Malaysia Twenty20 International cricketers
Place of birth missing (living people)
Cricketers at the 2010 Asian Games
Cricketers at the 2014 Asian Games
Southeast Asian Games gold medalists for Malaysia
Southeast Asian Games silver medalists for Malaysia
Southeast Asian Games medalists in cricket
Competitors at the 2017 Southeast Asian Games
Asian Games competitors for Malaysia